The Kochakidze was a Georgian noble family from the province of Mingrelia (Odishi). A legend traces their origin to the early 13th-century Khorasanian prince brought to Georgia as a hostage and converted to Christianity.

References 

Noble families of Georgia (country)
Georgian-language surnames